Reiko (れいこ,　レイコ,　麗子, 怜子, 伶子, 玲子, 令子, 礼子, 禮子, 冷子) is a feminine Japanese given name. Notable people with the name include:
, Japanese women's basketball player
Reiko Aylesworth (born 1972), an American actress
, J-pop idol
, Japanese actress
Reiko Douglas (Hashimoto) Japanese singer and comic, wife of Emmy-winning comedy writer Jack Douglas
, Japanese sprinter
Reiko Fujita (born 1972), Japanese archer
, Japanese av actress
, Japanese table tennis player
, Japanese actress and singer
, Japanese actress
Reiko Katsura, an actor
, Japanese voice actress
, Japanese figure skater and coach
, Japanese Go player
, a Japanese singer with the group Maher Shalal Hash Baz
, Japanese chemist and professor at University of Tokyo
, Japanese actress
, Japanese mathematician and professor
, Japanese shōjo manga artist 
, Japanese novelist and playwright
, Japanese actress and voice actress 
, Japanese swimmer, bronze medalist in the 2004 Summer Olympics
Reiko Nakano (born 1983), Japanese violinist, founder of Strings
Reiko Obata Japanese-American koto performer and composer
, Japanese actress
, Japanese manga artist
, Japanese businesswoman
, Japanese animator
, Japanese voice actress and J-pop idol
, Japanese diver
, Japanese actress and singer
, Japanese mathematician
, Japanese former international table tennis player
, American dancer and actress
, Japanese shōjo manga writer and illustrator
, Japanese badminton player
,serves as the Deputy National Commissioner of the Scout Association of Japan
, Japanese voice actress
, Japanese model and actress
, Japanese voice actress and narrator
, Japanese actress
, Japanese Olympic show jumping rider
, Japanese former volleyball player 
, Japanese yonkoma manga artist and illustrator
, Japanese-born art historian and curator based in New York
, Japanese long-distance runner
, Japanese fashion model and tarento
Reiko Yamashita (born 1973), a J-pop singer, member of the group Oororagoninmusume
, Japanese actress, voice actress and singer
, Japanese screenwriter

Reiko is a masculine German given name. Notable people with the name include:
Reiko Füting (born 1970) German composer

Fictional characters
Reiko, a male character from the fighting game series Mortal Kombat
Reiko Katherine Akimoto, a character in the manga/anime Kochira Katsushika-ku Kameari Kōen-mae Hashutsujo
Reiko Asakawa, the heroine of the J-Horror film Ring
Reiko Aya, the human pseudonym of Sailor Aluminium Siren, one of the Sailor Animamates in the Sailor Moon metaseries
Reiko Hinomoto, a character in Rumble Roses and Rumble Roses XX
Reiko Ichikawa, from Infinite Ryvius
Reiko Kisaragi, a supporting character from Go! Princess PreCure
Reiko Nagase, a virtual race queen from the racing game series Ridge Racer
Reiko Kurokaki, a fictional character from Marvel Nemesis: Rise of the Imperfects
Reiko Saeki, a character in the light novel series Asura Cryin'
Reiko Yuki, a psychic in the animated series Gilgamesh
Reiko Mikami, a character in the novel and anime Another
Reiko Mikami, the main character in the manga and anime Ghost Sweeper Mikami
Reiko Natsume, the late maternal grandmother of the protagonist of the ongoing manga and anime Natsume's Book of Friends
Reiko, the anti-hero of the animated YouTube video Kimyona Sekai.
Reiko Yanagi, a character in the Boku No Hero Academia in class 1B.
Reiko Tamura (disambiguation), multiple characters

See also
Reiko the Zombie Shop, a Japanese manga series by Rei Mikamoto
Reiko (novel), a novel by New Zealand author Ian Middleton
 Reikou, a citrus fruit

References

Japanese feminine given names